Degania: The First Kibbutz Fights Its Last Battle is a 2008 Israeli documentary directed by Yitzhak Rubin that premiered at the Haifa International Film Festival.

The film's subject is the bitter dispute over the transition of the first kibbutz, Degania—established in 1910 by a dozen young idealists on the banks of the Jordan River—from a model based on socialism, egalitarianism and mutual responsibility to one of free market capitalism and differential salaries. It follows the emotional and heated debates leading up to the fateful day in March 2007 when kibbutzniks voted on the proposal to privatize their community.

Reception
Rubin's documentary, which was shown at a number of kibbutzim, stimulated profound discussion. Former Knesset member Ran Cohen said that "the film represents both [the] dream and [the] disillusionment" that was the kibbutz experiment.

One Israeli reviewer, Meir Shnitzer, wrote that Rubin's film "is an important document. It is profound testimony highlighting the myth of privatization as every day the stock exchanges around the world expose the bluff. This is an overview of the process through which traditional values in Israeli society are crumbling away."

See also
 Israeli cinema

References

2008 films
Israeli documentary films
2000s Hebrew-language films
Films about the kibbutz
2008 documentary films